Dave Barry (born 16 September 1961) is an Irish former sportsperson.

He played Gaelic football with his local club St Finbarr's and was a member at senior level of the Cork county team from 1980 until 1991. Barry also played association football for Tramore Athletic, and played with (and managed) Cork City, making his League of Ireland debut in Cork's first ever League game on 16 September 1984. As a player, he won a league title, several national cups and played in numerous European ties for the club. When in charge, he won City's second FAI Cup and the side were also at the top end of the League of Ireland table under his stewardship. Perhaps his most famous moment is scoring the goal that put Cork City 1–0 up against giants Bayern Munich at Musgrave Park in the 1991–92 UEFA Cup. He also scored against Galatasaray at the Ali Sami Yen Stadium in the 1993–94 UEFA Champions League first round.

Honours

As a player
Cork City
 League of Ireland Premier Division: 1992–93
 League of Ireland Cup: 1987–88, 1994–95

As a manager
Cork City
 FAI Cup: 1998
 League of Ireland Cup: 1998–99

Sources
 Just Follow the Floodlights by Brian Kennedy

References

1961 births
Living people
Cork inter-county Gaelic footballers
Gaelic football forwards
Munster inter-provincial Gaelic footballers
Sportspeople from Cork (city)
St Finbarr's Gaelic footballers
Winners of two All-Ireland medals (Gaelic football)
Gaelic footballers who switched code
Association footballers from Cork (city)
Association football midfielders
Cork City F.C. managers
Cork City F.C. players
League of Ireland managers
League of Ireland players
League of Ireland XI players
Republic of Ireland association footballers
Republic of Ireland football managers
Tramore Athletic F.C. players